La Bourdonnais may refer to:

 Bertrand-François Mahé de La Bourdonnais (1699–1753), French naval officer
 Louis-Charles Mahé de La Bourdonnais (1795–1840), chess player and grandson of Bertrand-François